Leonel Jonathan Mena Gutiérrez (born 23 September 1982) is a Chilean footballer.

Honours

Club
Universidad de Concepción
 Copa Chile (1): 2008–09

Universidad Católica
 Primera División de Chile (1): 2010

Deportes Vallenar
Segunda División Profesional (1): 2017

External links
 
 

1982 births
Living people
Chilean footballers
Chile international footballers
C.D. Arturo Fernández Vial footballers
Universidad de Concepción footballers
Club Deportivo Universidad Católica footballers
Lota Schwager footballers
Chilean Primera División players
Primera B de Chile players
Association football midfielders